The 2013 Championship League Darts was the sixth and last edition of a darts competition — the Championship League Darts. The competition was organised and held by the Professional Darts Corporation, with the 2013 edition having a prize fund over £200,000.

The format of the tournament is similar to the Premier League Darts tournament, also organized by the PDC, except it is contested by a larger pool of players who are split up into a number of groups. Phil Taylor was the defending champion and won his fourth Championship League title with a 6–3 defeat over Michael van Gerwen in the final.

Format
The first group consists of the top eight players from the PDC Order of Merit. These eight players will play each other over the course of a day, receiving two points for each win. All matches were contested over a maximum of 11 legs with a player winning the match on reaching six legs. After all players play each other, the four players with the most points will progress to the semi-finals with the winners of those matches progressing into the final.

The winner of the final advances to the winners group which will take place at the end of the competition. The runner-up, losing semi-finalists and the players finishing fifth and sixth move into group two, where they will be joined by the next three players in the Order of Merit. The format of the second group was the same as the first group with players moving into the third group. In total there are eight groups before the final group takes place.

This format ensures that all players who do not win the group or finish in the last two positions have another chance to qualify for the winners group.

Prize money
The Championship League Darts awards prize money per leg won, as well as to the eventual winner, runner-up and semi-finalists of the entire tournament. The amount of prize money awarded per leg won is:

The amount of prize money awarded to the winner, runner-up and semi-finalists of the tournament is:

Tournament dates
The tournament takes place over nine days throughout September and October 2013. One group is played on each day. The dates are as follows:

Group 1 – Tuesday, September 24
Group 2 – Wednesday, September 25
Group 3 – Thursday, September 26
Group 4 – Tuesday, October 15
Group 5 – Wednesday, October 16
Group 6 – Thursday, October 17
Group 7 – Tuesday, October 22
Group 8 – Wednesday, October 23
Winners Group – Thursday, October 24

The tournament takes place at the Crondon Park Golf Club in Essex.

Group 1

 Phil Taylor (1)
 Michael van Gerwen (2)
 Adrian Lewis (3)
 Simon Whitlock (4)
 James Wade (5)
 Andy Hamilton (6)
 Dave Chisnall (7)
 Wes Newton (8)

Group 2

 Michael van Gerwen (2)
 Adrian Lewis (3)
 Andy Hamilton (6)
 Dave Chisnall (7)
 Wes Newton (8)
 Justin Pipe (9)
 Robert Thornton (11)
 Kevin Painter (12)

Group 3

 Michael van Gerwen (2)
 Adrian Lewis (3)
 Dave Chisnall (7)
 Wes Newton (8)
 Kevin Painter (12)
 Mervyn King (13)
 Brendan Dolan (14)
 Kim Huybrechts (15)

Group 4

 Michael van Gerwen (2)
 Dave Chisnall (7)
 Kevin Painter (12)
 Mervyn King (13)
 Kim Huybrechts (15)
 Terry Jenkins (16)
 Peter Wright (17)
 Gary Anderson (18)

Group 5

 Michael van Gerwen (2)
 Mervyn King (13)
 Kim Huybrechts (15)
 Peter Wright (17)
 Gary Anderson (18)
 Paul Nicholson (19)
 Ronnie Baxter (20)
 Mark Webster (21)

Group 6

 Mervyn King (13)
 Kim Huybrechts (15)
 Peter Wright (17)
 Gary Anderson (18)
 Paul Nicholson (19)
 Colin Lloyd (22)
 Ian White (23)
 Jamie Caven (24)

Group 7

 Kim Huybrechts (15)
 Peter Wright (17)
 Gary Anderson (18)
 Paul Nicholson (19)
 Jamie Caven (24)
 Richie Burnett (25)
 John Part (26)
 Steve Beaton (27)

Group 8

 Kim Huybrechts (15)
 Peter Wright (17)
 Gary Anderson (18)
 Paul Nicholson (19)
 Steve Beaton (27)
 Andy Smith (28)
 Mark Walsh (30)
 Colin Osborne (31)

Note:  Raymond van Barneveld (10) and  Vincent van der Voort (29) chose not to compete in the tournament.

Winners Group

 Phil Taylor (1)
 Michael van Gerwen (2)
 Andy Hamilton (6)
 Wes Newton (8)
 Kim Huybrechts (15)
 Terry Jenkins (16)
 Ian White (23)
 Richie Burnett (25)

Group stage

Group 1
Played on Tuesday 24 September and was won by Phil Taylor. He also hit a nine-dart finish during a 6–5 league stage defeat to Adrian Lewis. Simon Whitlock and James Wade were eliminated.

Group 2
Played on Wednesday 25 September and was won by Andy Hamilton. Robert Thornton and Justin Pipe were eliminated.

Group 3
Played on Thursday 26 September and was won by Wes Newton. Brendan Dolan and Adrian Lewis were eliminated.

Group 4
Played on Tuesday 15 October and was won by Terry Jenkins. Mervyn King and Michael van Gerwen threw nine-dart finishes during the day. Dave Chisnall and Kevin Painter were eliminated.

Group 5
Played on Wednesday 16 October and was won by Michael van Gerwen. Mark Webster and Ronnie Baxter were eliminated.

Group 6
Played on Thursday 17 October and was won by Ian White. Kim Huybrechts threw a nine-darter in the league stage. Mervyn King and Colin Lloyd were eliminated.

Group 7
Played on Tuesday 22 October and was won by Richie Burnett. Jamie Caven and John Part were eliminated.

Group 8
Played on Wednesday 23 October and was won by Kim Huybrechts. Colin Osborne and Mark Walsh were eliminated.

Winners Group
Played on 24 October and was won by Phil Taylor.

References

External links
 Official website

Championship League Darts
Championship League
Championship League Darts
Championship League Darts
Championship League Darts